Bearded Old Man is a 1634 drawing by Rembrandt in pen and brown ink with areas of wash. It is now in the Royal Library of the Netherlands in The Hague.

Sources
Royal Library of the Netherlands

1634 works
Drawings by Rembrandt